Miss America's Outstanding Teen 2007 was the 2nd Miss America's Outstanding Teen pageant held at the Linda Chapin Theater in the Orange County Convention Center in Orlando, Florida on August 19, 2006. At the conclusion of the event, Meghan Miller of Texas crowned her successor Maria DeSantis of New York. The pageant was hosted by Miss America 2006 Jennifer Berry and N'SYNC singer Joey Fatone.

The program was televised on The N, a branch of MTV Networks.

Results summary

Placements

Awards

Preliminary awards

Other awards

Pageant organization

Selection of contestants 
One delegate from each state, as well as the District of Columbia and the Virgin Islands, were chosen in local pageants held from September 2005 to July 2006.

Preliminary competitions
During the 3 days prior to the final night, the delegates compete in the preliminary competition, which include private interview with the judges and a show where they compete in talent, evening wear, lifestyle and fitness in athletic wear, and on-stage question. They were held August 16–18, 2006.

Final night of competition
During the finals, the top 10 contestants competed in lifestyle and fitness in athletic wear, talent, and evening gown, and the top 5 completed on-stage questions.

Contestants 
The Miss America's Outstanding Teen 2007 contestants were:

References 

2007
2007 in Florida
2007 beauty pageants